Livistona carinensis, commonly known as the Bankoualé palm, is a species of flowering plant in the family Arecaceae. It is one of the fan palms. Its leaves are distinguished by an armed petiole terminating in a rounded, costapalmate fan of numerous leaflets.
Livistona carinensis is found in Djibouti, Somalia, and Yemen, and is threatened by habitat loss.

References

carinensis
Flora of Djibouti
Flora of Somalia
Flora of Yemen
Trees of Africa
Vulnerable flora of Africa
Vulnerable flora of Asia
Taxonomy articles created by Polbot
Taxa named by Emilio Chiovenda